The 1993–94 IHL season was the 49th season of the International Hockey League, a North American minor professional league. 13 teams participated in the regular season, and the Atlanta Knights won the Turner Cup.

Regular season

Turner Cup-Playoffs

External links
 Season 1993/94 on hockeydb.com

IHL
International Hockey League (1945–2001) seasons